Robert Boyd Burch (August 11, 1886 – November 15, 1967) was an American football player and coach and judge. He served as the head coach at the  University of Cincinnati from 1909 to 1911, compiling a record of 16–8–2. Burch played college football at Yale University and was captain of the 1908 Yale Bulldogs football team.  Burch moved to San Diego, California in 1927.  He was appointed  in 1939 to the bench of the Superior Court of San Diego, serving until his retirement in 1960.  Burch died on November 15, 1967, in San Diego.

Head coaching record

References

External links
 

1886 births
1967 deaths
20th-century American judges
California state court judges
Cincinnati Bearcats football coaches
Yale Bulldogs football players
University of Cincinnati College of Law alumni
Sportspeople from Hamilton, Ohio
Coaches of American football from Ohio
Players of American football from Ohio